Kim Ofstad (born 25 November 1969) is a Norwegian drummer. He is best known from collaborations in the pop/soul band D'Sound where he was a member from its inception in 1993 to 2010 and his work with the production team Element.

Career 
Ofstad was born in Trondheim. He got his first drum kit when he was eight years old, and slightly older joined a brass band. He describes his teens as hybridic, as he felt equally at home in jazz clubs as in discothèques. He is a graduate of Heimdal videregående skole where he got his Examen artium in 1988, and studied music at Berklee College of Music in Boston, whence he moved to Oslo, the capital of Norway, in 1991. Here he formed D'Sound (1993) together with Jonny Sjo, a fellow student from Boston, he played with Sofian Benzaim.
Ofstad contributed for some time in Knut Værnes Trio, and has also recorded an album with Ab und Zu (1996) winning the Smuget award the year after (1997). Together with Audun Kleive he constituted a plain drum duet in 2008.

Ofstad was the drummer and drum-programmer of the production duo ELEMENT with producer/composer Hitesh Ceon, before the team was disbanded in January 2016. Until 2008 the team also included Jonny Sjo and was named 3Elementz. Their productions include the hit singles "Beggin'", "Glow" and "In My Head" with Madcon as well as the album An InCONvenient Truth, they have also produced and written songs for artists like Cee Lo Green, Musiq Soulchild, Alexandra Burke, Snoop Dogg, Rick Ross and reproduced two tracks with Michael Jackson for Motown Records.

Grammy Awards

|-
| style="text-align:center;" rowspan="4"| 2010 
|-
| style="text-align:left;"| CeeLo Green The Lady Killer || Best Pop Vocal Album || 
|-
|}

Discography 

With the trio Værnes/Ofstad/Berg
1995: Jacques Tati (Curling Legs)

With D'Sound
1996: Spice of Life (PolyGram)
1998: Beauty Is a Blessing (PolyGram)
2001: Talkin' Talk (Virgin Records)
2003: Doublehearted (Da Works)
2005: My Today (Edel Records)
2009: Starts and Ends (FarGo Musc)

With Sofian Benzaim
2005: This Is Sofian (C+C Records)

With Eivind Aarset
1998: Électronique Noire (Jazzland, EmArcy)

References

External links 
D'Sound Official Website
Element Official Website

1969 births
Living people
Jazzland Recordings (1997) artists
20th-century Norwegian drummers
21st-century Norwegian drummers
Norwegian jazz drummers
Male drummers
Norwegian jazz composers
Musicians from Trondheim
20th-century drummers
Male jazz composers
20th-century Norwegian male musicians
21st-century Norwegian male musicians
Ab und Zu members